Great Mirror may refer to:

 Speculum Maius, a 13th-century encyclopedia 
 The Great Mirror of Male Love
 Ōkagami, a Japanese historical tale